Plemkhoz is a rural locality (a selo) in Korostinskoye Rural Settlement, Kotovsky District, Volgograd Oblast, Russia. The population was 229 as of 2010. There are 3 streets.

Geography 
Plemkhoz is located on Volga Upland, on the right bank of the Burluk River, 15 km southeast of Kotovo (the district's administrative centre) by road. Kotovo is the nearest rural locality.

References 

Rural localities in Kotovsky District